Dining With the Sharks is the ninth studio album by American rock band Blue Cheer. It features a cover of Jimi Hendrix's classic "Foxy Lady".

Track listing
"Big Noise" (Bruce Stephens, John Rewind, Dickie Peterson) – 4:51
"Outrider" (Peterson) – 6:19
"Sweet Child of Reeperbahn" (Peterson, Dieter Saller) – 4:12
"Gunfight" (Peterson, Saller) – 6:53
"Audio Whore" (Peterson) – 3:53
"Cut the Costs" (Peterson, Saller) – 3:41
"Sex Soldier" (Peterson, Saller) – 5:05
"When Two Spirits Touch" (Peterson) – 3:52
"Pull the Trigger" (Saller) – 5:20
"Foxy Lady" (Jimi Hendrix) – 3:51

Personnel
Blue Cheer
Dickie Peterson – bass, vocals, guitar
Paul Whaley – drums, percussion
Dieter Saller – guitars, percussion

Additional musicians
Tony McPhee – slide guitar on track 8
Dave Anderson, Mick Jones, Harry Love, Roland Hofmann – handclaps and good vibes

Production
Roland Hofmann – producer
Harry Love, Dave Anderson – engineers
Hardy Heinlin – mixing
Hans-Jörg Mauksch – mastering

References

1991 albums
Blue Cheer albums